The Powerpuff Girls is an American animated television series franchise that takes place in the fictional city of Townsville and stars the titular Powerpuff Girls, Blossom, Bubbles, Buttercup, who appear in the 1998 Powerpuff Girls series and the 2006 Powerpuff Girls Z series, as well as Bliss, who joins the trio beginning with the 2016 Powerpuff Girls series.

Secondary characters include Professor Utonium, the girls' father who created them in his lab; Mayor, the goodhearted but dimwitted mayor of Townsville who frequently calls the girls via hotline to ask for help to protect the city; Ms. Bellum, Mayor's secretary who acts as the voice of reason when he makes decisions; and Ms. Keane, the girls' kindergarten teacher at Pokey Oaks school. The series' villains include Mojo Jojo, a hyper-intelligent, megalomaniacal ape; HIM, a mysterious demonic being; Fuzzy Lumpkins, a Bigfoot-like hillbilly; Princess Morbucks, a wealthy, spoiled girl; and the Gangreen Gang, five green-skinned hoodlums.

Series creator Craig McCracken originally conceived the characters while attending the California Institute of the Arts in 1991. McCracken fleshed-out the premise as a short pilot called The Whoopass Girls in Whoopass Stew. After a name change and character redesigns, a new pilot, called "The Powerpuff Girls: Meat Fuzzy Lumkins", aired on Cartoon Network's World Premiere Toons animation showcase in 1995. High viewer approval ratings convinced the network to approve a full series, which premiered in 1998. After the original series ended in 2005, a reboot began airing in 2016.

Origin
In June 1991, Craig McCracken, a student of the animation program of CalArts, initially created a drawing of three girls on a small sheet of orange construction paper as a birthday card design for his brother. The following year he included the two girls as the main characters of his short film Whoopass Stew! The Whoopass Girls in: A Sticky Situation. This was intended to be part one of four Whoopass Girls shorts, but only one was produced. McCracken felt that he wanted to make a superhero student film but felt that the muscular guy standard was already played out. Then after drawing the three little girls he started imagining them in superhero situations. McCracken's Whoopass Girls short was picked up for a series by Cartoon Network in 1993. After the name Whoopass was dropped for Powerpuff to include it in the What a Cartoon! showcase, the Powerpuff Girls then appeared in two What a Cartoon! shorts before receiving their own series.

Characters

The Powerpuff Girls

As depicted in the opening sequence of each episode, the Powerpuff Girls, Blossom, Bubbles, and Buttercup, were created by Professor Utonium in an attempt to create the "perfect little girl" using a mixture of "sugar, spice, and everything nice" (shown in respective fields of sky blue, lime green, and bright pink). However, he accidentally spilled a mysterious substance called "Chemical X" into the mixture, creating, instead of the "perfect little girl", three girls (each possessing one of the above elements dominating her personality), and granting all three superpowers including flight, superhuman strength, super speed, limited invulnerability, x-ray vision, super senses, heat vision, and energy projection. In the original pilot, the accidental substance was a can of "Whoopass", which was replaced by "Chemical X" in the aired version.

The three girls all have oval-shaped heads, abnormally large eyes (inspired by Margaret Keane's art), stubby arms and legs, and lack noses, ears, fingers, necks, and flat feet with toes (McCracken preferred them to look more symbolic of actual girls rather than going for a "realistic" look, meaning fewer body parts were needed). They wear dresses that match the colors of their eyes with black stripes, as well as white tights and black Mary Janes.

Blossom

Blossom (voiced by Cathy Cavadini in the What a Cartoon! episodes and the series) is the tactician and self-proclaimed leader of the Powerpuff Girls. Her personality ingredient is "everything nice", her signature color is bright pink, and she has long red-orange waist-length hair with bangs in a triangular part with a red bow and a pink hair clip with a red heart. She was named for having spoken freely and honestly to the Professor shortly after her creation as shown in The Powerpuff Girls Movie. She is often seen as the most level-headed, intelligent, and composed member of the group and also strong and determined. She is also a master strategist and apt planner. Her unique power is freezing objects with her breath as seen in the episode "Ice Sore".

In Powerpuff Girls Z the anime version of Blossom is named  / Hyper Blossom (ハイパー・ブロッサム Haipā Burossamu) in the original Japanese version while being called Blossom in the English dubbed version. She is depicted as the first member of the Powerpuff Girls Z. She uses a yo-yo as her signature weapon, but she can use her bow as a weapon if she doesn't have her yo-yo. Like the original, she's the self-proclaimed leader of the team. However, she is extremely ditzy, a bit boy-crazy, given to crushes and romantic fantasies. She is very familiar with the mahou shojo genre, along with some typical anime/super sentai concepts and is regarded as a "hero maniac" in school, especially by Buttercup. Blossom also has a strong appetite for sugary foods. Blossom was the first to encounter Mojo Jojo at the park after buying candy. If she doesn't eat sweets for a long time she can get very cranky. But she is getting used to it. Although often distracted and has been known to whine, Blossom tries her best to protect New Townsville, lead the girls, and help her friends regardless of her situation. (In one instance, when Blossom is unable to transform, she tries to fight alongside Bubbles and Buttercup wearing a sentai hero mask). Often she can be very clever and crafty when needed, usually being the first to come up with a plan to trick or defeat a monster that the girls are having trouble with. She has a younger sister named Kasey.

In the reboot and Lego Dimensions, voiced by Amanda Leighton, the 2016 version of Blossom is once again depicted as the leader of the Team. Her appearance is similar to her original counterpart with the exception of her bow, which is more rounded. She loves organization and hates when things are messy and out of order. She has a perfect attendance record and is an overachiever. She can be stubborn at times, but still comes through. She also has ice breath like her 1998 counterpart. Her trail is bright pink with little squares. Her unique abilities are: Ice breath, genius-level intelligence, microscopic vision, natural leadership skills, and intuitive aptitude. She also can project bright pink energy and manipulate it into various household and office items; an ability her 1998 counterpart in the original show does not possess.

Bubbles
Bubbles (voiced by Tara Strong in the series, and by Kath Soucie in the What a Cartoon! episodes) is the "softest and sweetest" of the three. Her signature color is blue, her personality ingredient is "sugar", and she has blonde hair in pigtails. Bubbles is seen as kind and very sweet but she is also capable of extreme rage and can fight monsters just as well as her sisters can. Her best friend is a stuffed octopus doll she calls "Octi", and she also loves animals. She exhibits the ability to both understand multiple languages (mostly Spanish) and communicate with various animals; her unique powers are projecting powerful sonic screams, and creating a shockwave of thunder with a single clap from her hands.

In Powerpuff Girls Z the anime version of Bubbles is named as  / Rolling Bubbles (ローリング・バブルス Rōringu Baburusu) in the original Japanese version while she is still named Bubbles in the English dubbed version. She is depicted as the second member of the Powerpuff Girls Z team who uses a bubble wand as her signature weapon. Compared to her original counterpart, who is known for being the most childish of the three, Bubbles is comparatively mature and often acts as the mediator in many situations and tries to calm her teammates down when in such situations. However, she is the ditziest member of the team, often appearing a bit clueless, and doesn't seem to understand her powers completely, along with a few other things. She is also very polite and always uses honorifics at the end of names and ends most of her sentences with "desu wa". She is more concerned with shopping, her appearance and her outfits, and perhaps because of this, she seems to be very popular among her male classmates. While she seems oblivious to the many boys that love her, she's already in love with a boy named Cody, a boy on whom she has had a crush ever since she was six years old. She retains her hairstyle during the reimagining, but her pigtails are slightly longer, and curl into ringlets. She also uses curlers (3 balls on each pigtail) when going to bed. Like her American counterpart, Bubbles is a compassionate, gentle and innocent character, possessing a love for animals and her favorite doll, Octi (her American counterpart has the same octopus doll of the same name). She is represented by bubbles.

In the reboot voiced by Kristen Li, the 2016 version of Bubbles has shoulder-length blonde hair in pigtails just like her original counterpart, except with new blue hair ties and the pigtails being set slightly higher-up than previously. Bubbles is an animal lover like her 1998 counterpart and usually tries to save the day the nice way. Like her 1998 counterpart, she can be a bit naive but can also get angered very easily. When in bed she has Octi by her side. Her trail is blue with little circles. Unlike her original counterpart, she is shown to have talent with computers and can even create and program her own video games which have become extremely popular among the children in Townsville, including her sisters. Her special abilities include: Animal telepathy, animal empathy, zoolingulism, sound manipulation, sonic waves, sonic blasts, vocal mimicry, hypnotic singing, and multilingualism. She also can project bright blue energy and manipulate it into various animals due to her love for them; an ability her 1998 counterpart in the original show does not possess.

Buttercup
Buttercup (voiced by E. G. Daily) is described as a "tough hotheaded tomboy". Her personality ingredient is "spice", her signature color is green, and she has short black hair in a flip. She loves to get dirty, fights hard and plays rough; she does not plan and is all action. Her unique powers are to curl her tongue, creating a whirling green tornado, and creating fireballs by rubbing her hands together 'till smoke comes out which forms a flaming ball that she throws at an opponent. McCracken originally wanted to name the character "Bud" until a friend suggested the name Buttercup. According to The Powerpuff Girls Movie, Buttercup really dislikes the name she was given.

In Powerpuff Girls Z the anime version of Buttercup is named as  / Powered Buttercup (パワード・バターカップ Pawādo Batākappu) in the original Japanese version and is still just named Buttercup in the English dubbed version. She is depicted as the third and final member of the Powerpuff Girls Z who uses a giant mallet as her signature weapon. Like the original Buttercup, she is a tomboy and is the most easily enraged of the three. Buttercup is known at school for being the most athletic girl as she plays tennis, practices martial arts, and numerous other activities, and spends a great deal of time watching sports on television. She is especially good at soccer due to her strengthened determination after receiving new soccer cleats when she was younger. This may be part of the reason why she has so many fangirls, much to her dismay. She detests anything girly, particular skirts, which makes wearing the Powerpuff uniform a bit more awkward. She speaks with a hard and masculine edge and rarely uses honorifics when speaking. Buttercup lives with her parents and her two brothers, the father of which is a professional masked-wrestler. She is represented by stars.

In the reboot voiced by Natalie Palamides, the 2016 version of Buttercup's appearance is almost exactly like her original counterpart except she has a cowlick on the back of her head. She is depicted as a tomboy who loves to get into action and likes to play sports, hanging out with boys and having fun like her 1998 counterpart, She has a fear of spiders like her 1998 counterpart as well. She has a temper that can usually get out of control. She is also the main archenemy of Manboy, who called her "princess", which she hates the most, Blossom and Bubbles attempt to stop her. Her trail is green with little triangles. Unlike her two sisters, she does not possess any special abilities of her own. However, she, like her sisters, can project bright green energy and manipulate it into various weaponry; an ability her 1998 counterpart and her sisters in the original show does not possess. She also excels at mathematics in "Buttercup vs. Math".

Secondary characters

Professor Utonium

Professor Utonium (voiced by Tom Kane) is a scientist who works in his home in the suburbs of the City of Townsville, and the Powerpuff Girls' creator and father. A stereotypical scientist, his general attire is a white lab coat and black pants. The Professor once housed a chimpanzee named Jojo (later to become Mojo Jojo) as a lab assistant who proved to be reckless and destructive. While the Professor was stirring his perfect girl concoction, Jojo shoved him, causing him to accidentally break a flask containing the mysterious "Chemical X" which spilled into the formula, thus creating the Powerpuff Girls. The Professor is a genius in many fields of science, has shown knowledge in fields such as physics, chemistry, and biology as well as being a skilled inventor. Aside from his role as a scientist, he acts as a parent to the Powerpuff Girls. Although he apparently did not legally "adopt" the girls, everyone who addresses him calls him "their father" and they as "his daughters". The Professor can be strict, easily manipulated, and overprotective at times, but still retains his caring fatherly image. In the episode "Keen for Keane", the girls set up Professor Utonium and their kindergarten teacher Ms. Keane on a date for Valentine's Day, resulting in the two temporarily becoming an item.

In Powerpuff Girls Z,  (voiced by Taiten Kusunoki and Louis Chirillo) has a son named Ken Kitazawa, who is responsible for all those affected by the Chemical Z lights, especially the Powerpuff Girls Z. Professor Utonium was originally experimenting with the substance Chemical X and strove to find a way to change its chemical properties. Professor Utonium has created several inventions throughout the series; the most important one being his Chemical Z Particle Ray, which allows him to transform those affected by the lights back to normal (although it doesn't prevent recurring transformations nor is it able to work on all black light victims). He seems to be aware of the effect Ken's lack of a mother has had on his son, assuming that it had caused him to be a bully to the girls. However, this does not change his behavior towards Ken. He appears to be a gentle father figure like the original Professor Utonium was in The Powerpuff Girls. He treats the girls as members of his family and is very close to the Mayor and Miss Bellum. While he is very gentle and serious, Professor Utonium may, at times, act a little less mature than he usually does. In episode 37, when the Powerpuff Girls Z are "grounded" from using their powers for a day when they have to take a test in school, Professor Utonium fills in for them, donning an exo-suit with a laser beam gun and rocket pack, calling himself "Professor Puff Z" (this is most likely based on the American cartoon episode "Powerprof" in which he also donned a fighting suit but drove the girls crazy with lame one-liners during battles). He also appears to have a mecha that looks like Professor Puff Z, which he uses against the Mojo Robo. Although he seems unsuccessful at first, he is able to defeat Mojo Jojo, Fuzzy Lumpkins, and the Amoeba Boys. His main attack is the Uto Beam. At the end of the episode, Ken, Peach, and himself call themselves "Powerpuff Boys Z" as their own self-proclaimed superhero team.

The Mayor of Townsville 
 The Mayor of Townsville (voiced by Tom Kenny in the series and by Jim Cummings in the What a Cartoon! episodes) is generally referred throughout only as "Mayor", although he is referred to as "Barney" by his wife in the episode "Boogie Frights". He is short and elderly with a fringe of white hair around a bald scalp and a thick white mustache. He wears a monocle over his left eye and a small top hat that “floats” just above his head. The Mayor is rather dimwitted but cares deeply about his city. He has a love for pickles and is very childish at times. He sometimes calls the girls for very silly reasons, as seen in the episode "Bubblevicious" when he calls because of a traffic jam. The What a Cartoon! episode "Meat Fuzzy Lumpkins" featured a different Mayor who was younger, taller and more competent than the Mayor of the series.

While less extreme in comparison to the Mayor of Townsville, the Mayor is very childish and has a very short attention span. He seems to worry quite a lot when the girls are fighting and wishes that they could cause a little less damage. The Mayor, like many of the characters in the anime, loves sweets. The Mayor also has a younger brother, who is the Principal of the school. It was through him that Miss Bellum and the Mayor were able to rearrange the classes so that the girls would be in the same class. However, the Mayor and the Principal, don't always get along, and even the most minor of things will set off an argument, which often time leads to name-calling. He also deals with his brother when the girls aren't doing well in class due to them skipping class to save the city.

Ms. Bellum 
Ms. Sara Bellum (voiced by Jennifer Martin in the series) is the Mayor's secretary, who often handles issues that the Mayor cannot (and, in a way, is the one really in charge of Townsville). She has long, curly red hair, wears a red business suit and red high heel shoes for a secretary look. Her face is never fully shown onscreen, although The Powerpuff Girls Rule!!! revealed part of it. Running gags include other onscreen characters often finding her attractive, the camera focusing on her curves, and her face always being obscured. Her name is a pun on the word cerebellum presumably due to her intelligent and wise nature. She also proved to be a capable fighter, battling the villainess Sedusa by herself when the girls were disabled.

In Powerpuff Girls Z,  (voiced by Youko Kawanami and Nicole Oliver) has blonde hair compared to the original's red hair. Usually, Sara Bellum covers her face with a tablet computer, which has lipstick imprinted on it. While the mayor is different from his original counterpart and is more competent, Sara Bellum in the anime still does most of the mayor's work for him in a manner similar to the original Sara Bellum, and still appears to be the brains of the operation.

Miss Bellum appears in one episode of 2016 series ("Bye Bye, Bellum") in a cameo appearance, and will be portrayed by Robyn Lively in the Powerpuff live action reboot.

Ms. Keane
Ms. Keane (voiced by Jennifer Hale and by Kath Soucie in the What-a-Cartoon! episodes) is the kindergarten teacher of Pokey Oaks Kindergarten. She wears an orange shirt, a red vest, brown pants, and has short black hair and light blue eyes. She is patient, wise, understanding, and protective of her students, making her a well-liked, motherly figure. She is also an animal lover, owning a ginger cat named Valentino, and the class pet hamster, Twiggy. Ms. Keane forbids any fighting in school, even if there is a crisis taking place within it; she convinces the girls that there are other ways to solve problems other than fighting as demonstrated in the episodes "Schoolhouse Rocked" and "Imaginary Fiend". She is named after Margaret Keane who was the main influence behind the design of the Powerpuff Girls.

In Powerpuff Girls Z,  (voiced by Tomoko Akiya and Tabitha St. Germain) is the girls' primary and secondary school teacher who is very pretty and loved by her male students, although the female students don't like her as much, especially Princess Morbucks. Like the original, she is kind and incredibly patient.

Narrator
Narrator (voiced by Tom Kenny in the series and Craig McCracken in Whoopass Stew and by Ernie Anderson in the What a Cartoon! episodes) is the enthusiastic but unseen narrator of the show. He often comments on the proceedings of the episode, says things which happen to be hints about the plots of certain episodes, and frequently breaks the fourth wall. He is also shown to be the only connection between the audience and the girls, as he can "talk" to both and even be involved, such as Mojo Jojo transforming him into a dog. In the episode "Simian Says", he is kidnapped by Mojo Jojo, who promptly takes his place as the episode begins.

Talking Dog
Talking Dog (voiced by Tom Kane in the series and by Paul Mercier in the What a Cartoon! episodes) is a small white dog with black ears and nose and a black spot on his back, wearing a red collar with a yellow dog tag. When he stays with the girls he is shown to be blunt, abrasive and insulting, though his demeanor remains straightforward and earnest. He is frequently abused in almost every appearance he makes; as a running gag, no one ever seems to regard his pain and simply ignores him.

Mitch Mitchelson
Mitch Mitchelson (voiced by Tom Kenny): The bully at Pokey Oaks Kindergarten. Mitch has brownish hair, and wears a black T-shirt with the words "MITCH ROCKS" on the front. Usually talks in a gruff voice; he torments the kids in the class in a few episodes, though he is not a major threat. He is Buttercup's close friend, according to Buttercup in her interview in the DVD features of The Powerpuff Girls Movie. For a brief time he hosted a short segment on Cartoon Network called "Mitch Rocks", where he looked at various things and said whether they "rock" or not.

Villains

Mojo Jojo

Mojo Jojo (voiced by Roger L. Jackson) is a mad scientist anthropomorphic chimpanzee with great intelligence, who speaks with a Japanese accent in an overly redundant manner. As the main antagonist of the series and the Powerpuff Girls' archenemy, Mojo Jojo was Professor Utonium's reckless laboratory chimpanzee, Jojo, before Professor Utonium created the Powerpuff Girls; the same accident that created the Girls gave Jojo his super-intelligence. He has green skin, pink scleras, and wears a white glass dome-shaped helmet that covers his oversized, protruding brain. He wears white gloves and boots, a blue suit with a white belt, and a flowing purple cape. Despite his high intelligence, his plans often contain flaws that he overlooks, and he rarely has much success against the Girls, as their superpowers are too much for his inventions. However, he is a master at manipulation and trickery, often fooling the Girls into thinking he has changed despite their constant encounters. Mojo lives in an observatory atop a dormant volcano located in the middle of Townsville's municipal park. In the 2016 series, Mojo has a mother who also appears to be evil.

HIM
HIM (voiced by Tom Kane) is a mysterious, sinister, effeminate, and supernatural demon. His physical appearance is an amalgamation of sorts with lobster-like claws, red/orange skin, pointed ears, a hooked nose, yellow/green eyes and a long curled beard, wearing makeup, a woman's red jacket and skirt, and black stiletto heel boots. His voice ranges from a high-pitched falsetto to a deep, booming basso profondo. HIM's plans are usually psychological in nature, and often consist of manipulating events to either drive the Powerpuff Girls insane or drive wedges between them. HIM possesses various supernatural and demonic abilities such as shapeshifting, mind manipulation, reality warping, various kinds of energy manipulation, and more. Craig McCracken has stated that the character "HIM" was inspired by the mannerisms of the Chief Blue Meanie in the 1968 film Yellow Submarine. McCracken also stated HIM is his favorite villain.

Fuzzy Lumpkins
Fuzzy Lumpkins (voiced by Jim Cummings) is a pink Bigfoot-like creature with a wide jaw, a green nose, two antennas on his head, big blue overalls, and brown boots, who commonly plays a banjo which he calls "Jo." He was the first villain introduced in the series, appearing in the pilot "Meat Fuzzy Lumpkins," in which he turned the people of Townsville into meat after he lost in a jam contest. He speaks in a southern accent, and lives in the woods next to Townsville. Fuzzy has a limited intellectual capacity, and is not nearly so active and ambitious as most of the villains in the series.  He usually limits himself to shooting anyone whom he finds trespassing on his property, though also prone to destructive fits of rage; when angry, Fuzzy turns dark red, grows claws, and his teeth become sharp fangs. Fuzzy (according to Professor Utonium's research) belongs to a race of "Lumpkins"; he has three siblings (Furry, Fluffy, and Hairy), three nephews (Buzzy, Wuzzy, and Scuzzy), and several dozen cousins who closely resemble him.

Princess Morbucks
Princess Morbucks (voiced by Jennifer Hale) is a spoiled, rich, and bratty little girl, whose partially unseen and mostly mute father allows her to finance various evil plots to destroy the Powerpuff Girls. Her supervillain outfit consists of a yellow, Powerpuff-style dress, black gloves and boots, and a tiara. Her hatred of the girls stems from her rebuffed attempt to become one of them. Her father is "Daddy" Morbucks, a large, rotund man whose face and head are always hidden from the viewer. He dotes on his daughter and usually indulges in her whims, but it is hinted that his patience is limited and Princess fears truly angering him. Thanks to him, Morbucks has access to virtually unlimited financial resources. In the 2016 series, Morbucks is voiced by Haley Mancini and Kelsy Abbott, and seeks to kill and replace the Powerpuff Girls rather than simply join them.

The Gangreen Gang

The Gangreen Gang (sometimes referred as The Ganggreen Gang) are a gang of five teenage hoodlums and punks who are green-skinned and unhealthy-looking. Not possessing any powers or exceptional abilities, the Gang is normally not too much of a threat to the girls, but have shown themselves to be very dangerous when motivated. They also delight in tormenting those weaker than themselves, especially children and the elderly. The Gangreen Gang lives in an old shack located in Townsville's junkyard.
 Ace (voiced by Jeff Bennett): A mean-spirited and opportunistic rogue with a slick-back hairdo, a colored vest-jacket, a peach-fuzz mustache, a pair of shades, and also has fangs. As the Gang's leader and their smartest member, he is the instigator of most of their antisocial activities, and does possess a certain charismatic charm that allows him to sweet-talk people who ought to know better, such as Ms. Keane in the episode "School House Rocked" and even Buttercup in the episode "Buttercrush". He speaks in a nasally Italian/New Yorker accent. In 2018, Ace temporarily became the replacement bassist of the virtual band Gorillaz while Murdoc Niccals was in prison.
 Snake (voiced by Tom Kenny in the series): A slippery character with a forked tongue, skinny body, and a hissing voice, Snake is the Gang's second-in-command, but this mostly makes him a yes-man to Ace. He does have a personality of his own, but it is usually silenced due to Ace punching him when he speaks out of line (or asks a foolish question). It is revealed in "School House Rocked" that his real name is Sanford D. Ingleberry.
 Lil' Arturo (voiced by Tom Kenny and by Carlos Alazraqui in his first appearance): A malevolent Mexican midget boy, Lil' Arturo seems to take the most amusement from the Gang's activities. In the episode "School House Rocked" he carries around a switchblade-styled comb he calls "Maria", a treasured gift from his incarcerated father. He has a rather prominent underbite. His full name is Arturo de la Guerra, which is Spanish for "Arthur from the War". His small size allows him to sneak through cramped spaces and passages that the rest of the gang cannot reach.
 Grubber (voiced by Jeff Bennett): A barefoot hunchback with untidy hair, grubby clothes, and protruding eyes. He also appears to be mostly mute, communicating instead through blowing a raspberry. He does, however, occasionally demonstrate unexpected talents, such as playing the violin, speaking eloquently or performing impersonations. When attending the girls' school for a short time, Grubber showed that he was able to horribly contort his body, making him briefly resemble a well-spoken and handsome-looking young man before snapping back to his normal self.
 Big Billy (voiced by Jeff Bennett): A hulking, dimwitted colossus who acts as the Gang's muscle. Though he does at times display a childlike innocence, he mostly just does the bidding of his more savvy and vindictive friends. In the episode "School House Rocked", it is revealed that his real name is William W. Williams and that he is a cyclops, with his single eye hidden beneath his shaggy red hair. Although he rarely fares any better in combat against the girls than the rest of the gang, he has the muscular power to stop a speeding train from running down citizens from the track and tackle monsters to the ground with his bare hands. He is fiercely loyal to anyone he considers to be a friend, and briefly tried to help the Powerpuff Girls after they saved him from being run over by a train. However, his clumsiness and lack of intelligence made him more destructive as a hero than he was as a villain.

The Amoeba Boys
The Amoeba Boys (voiced by Chuck McCann in the series and the What a Cartoon! episodes and by Lou Romano in Whoopass Stew) are a trio of amoebae who are the villains featured in McCracken's original short, Whoopass Stew in A Sticky Situation. They reappear in the What a Cartoon! short Crime 101. With their mobster affectations, these aspiring criminals would love nothing more than to be regarded as serious villains worthy of fighting, and even getting beaten up and sent to jail by the Powerpuff Girls. Unfortunately, their brains are too primitive to devise a crime above the level of littering or jaywalking. Indeed, they considered stealing an orange to be their greatest crime ever in the episode "Divide and Conquer". They are Townsville's least malicious villains, even having a friendship-of-sorts with the Girls. They are generally harmless, but their actions have on occasion endangered both the Girls and the town by accident.
 Bossman: The leader and general spokesman of the Amoeba Boys. He wears a gray fedora. In the pilot Whoopass Stew in A Sticky Situation, he is depicted with a cigar in his mouth.
 Junior: The smallest one of the Amoeba Boys. He wears a black cap and usually repeats whatever Bossman says. In the episode Crime 101, he is named Tiny.
 Slim: The tallest one of the Amoeba Boys. He wears a brown fedora and is even slower and more incompetent than the other two amoebas. In the episode Crime 101, he is called Skinny Slim.

Sedusa
Sedusa (voiced by Jennifer Hale in the series) is a young, beautiful Gorgon-like mistress of disguise and seductress who uses her feminine wiles to influence men to do her bidding, such as Professor Utonium, the Mayor, and the Gangreen Gang. When her identity is revealed, she typically doffs down to her leotard battle suit and fights with her prehensile hair. Her eyes also change color depending on her mood. When she is acting benevolent her eye color is green, but when she is angry, revealing her true villainous nature, her eyes turn red. Similar to Ms. Bellum, Sedusa is absent from the reboot due to female modifications.

The Rowdyruff Boys
The Rowdyruff Boys are the evil male counterparts of the Powerpuff Girls created by Mojo Jojo using a mixture of "snips, snails, and a puppy dog tail" and toilet water in his cell in Townsville Prison in the episode called "The Rowdyruff Boys". The Rowdyruff Boys are essentially violent bullies who have the same powers as the Powerpuff Girls, with their own techniques as well. They were ultimately destroyed when the girls kissed them. After being resurrected by HIM in the episode "The Boys Are Back in Town", the Boys' hairstyles become noticeably spikier. The Boys wear long-sleeved shirts with a black stripe in each, black trousers and black, low-top sneakers with white laces and white soles.
 Brick (voiced by Rob Paulsen in the series): Blossom's equivalent, he is the short-tempered, self-proclaimed leader of the Rowdyruff Boys. He has an abrasive and rash attitude, which often causes conflict with his brothers. He wears a backwards red baseball cap compared to Blossom's bow. He also originally had bangs, which were replaced with long spiky hair when he was revived.
 Boomer (also voiced by Paulsen in the series): Bubbles' equivalent, he is a loud-mouthed dunce, as opposed to Bubbles' naïve sweetness, and has been known to like disgusting things. After his resurrection, Boomer is shown to be the least intelligent of the boys and he is often bullied and bossed around by his brothers. Boomer's hair parts in a curved fashion like Bubbles', but is longer and spiky on each end, in a wings haircut.
 Butch (voiced by Roger L. Jackson in the series): Buttercup's equivalent. After his resurrection, Butch becomes more hyperactive and overly excited. Butch's hair is spiked upwards, abandoning his previous cowlick from his first appearance. He also shares Buttercup's small triangular hair parting.

Powerpuff Girls Z-exclusive characters

Ken Kitazawa
 (voiced by Makiko Ohmoto and Cathy Weseluck) is Professor Utonium's eight-year-old son who is somewhat responsible for turning regular girls into the titular Powerpuff Girls Z in Powerpuff Girls Z, and numerous other characters into villains using Chemical Z. He used it to blast a glacier in order to set the weather back to normal, but the impact resulted in the explosion of several lights, which affected all those who came in contact with it. Despite being younger than the girls, he acts a lot more mature and the education he receives from his father is considered more advanced than what the girls learn in their school, earning his PhD at an early age. Ken, in a later episode, attended school in order to gain social skills and make friends. While he considers grade school life boring, he has made several friends, including Jou, who was originally his rival and Kuriko who is Momoko's young sister. Ken sees the girls as older sisters and has to often put up with them, though he still cares for them deeply. Ken interchanges between calling Professor Utonium "Dad" and "Professor". During a serious situation (such as a monster attack or investigation) he will try to refer to Utonium as "Professor," but in less serious situations (like packing a lunch) he will call him "Dad." Ken often corrects himself, because he usually uses the wrong honorific (e.g. "Dad, I mean, Professor"). In the twenty-sixth episode, it is revealed that Ken's mother works on a space station, therefore making her very busy and unable to be with Ken. Thanks to the girls and Santa Claus (whom he believed did not exist at first based on a 70% possibility), he was able to see her and is now able to communicate with her clearly on the lab's monitor. In episode 37, when the Powerpuff Girls Z are "grounded" from using their powers for a day when they have to take a test in school, Ken fills in for them, donning a superhero suit consisting of a black bodysuit, a white cape, white gloves, white boots, a red vest with gold shoulder pads and a yellow "Z" on it, and a blue helmet with the yellow letters "KK" on it, while brandishing a blue polearm with a yellow "U" at the end, and calling himself "Kamikaze Ken Z". Despite having no powers or attacks, he uses traps and other props as weapons when he defends their lab from the Gangreen Gang, ultimately driving them off by tricking them into drinking bottles of hot sauce (thinking they were the containers of Chemical Z). Ken's pre-production art bears a strong resemblance to Dexter from Dexter's Laboratory, even the current incarnation. However, in one of the special edition booklets, it is explained the design originated from Kid Utonium from the original series.

Peach
 (voiced by Tomoko Kaneda and Matt Hill (ep 1-37a), Simon Hill (ep 37b-52)) is Ken's pet robot dog who was also affected by a white Chemical Z ray, gaining the ability to talk, as well as a considerable boost in intelligence. Peach's shout prompts the girls to transform either in person or through a long-distance communication device, although a modification to the girls' compacts allows them to transform on their own. Additionally, Peach can re-summon the girls' powers, even when their powers are drained. Peach is also capable of sniffing out those who are affected by the black rays, white rays, and Him's black particles. The black ray monsters/villains that have been sniffed by Peach are stored in his data banks for later reference. This ability, however, is hindered if his target is wearing heavy cosmetics (as was the case with Sedusa). Peach is also capable of sniffing and identifying others more clearly than other dogs, even when someone's appearance has been completely changed.

Kuriko Akatsutsumi

Momoko's eight-year-old sister, and she is just as hyper and addicted to the sentai/hero genre as her older sister. She is very independent and likes to pretend she is a heroine. She admires the Powerpuff Girls Z and wishes to be a heroine just like them. She admires Rolling Bubbles and Powered Buttercup, but shows little favor for Hyper Blossom who, unbeknownst to her, is actually her own sister. She is also always looking for new ways to annoy her sister. She appears to be quite interested in Ken, especially when she realizes that he knows her sister. Similarly, Ken seems interested in her because of her resemblance to Blossom.

Kiyoko Gotokuji

Miyako's grandmother, who she lives with in a large traditional-looking house. She is gentle sounding and usually gets distracted by nostalgic things, but she can also be strict when it comes to manners. You also never see her eyes ever open, as they are always closed to portray a happy feeling. She is a traditional Japanese woman.

Tokio Matsubara

Kaoru's father, a professional wrestler and loving family man who is never seen without his mask. He left for Mexico when Kaoru was young, and studied the art of the luchador after experiencing a losing streak that could have cost him his career. His teacher was severely injured in what is implied to be his final match. The Masked Mexico was given his teacher's mask, which in true lucha spirit, he never removes, except when taking a shower. Since then, Kaoru has forgotten what her father's face looks like. There is no photograph in their family album that shows what his real face looks like either, mirroring Miss Bellum's running gag. After he wins the match against Giant Panda Mask, Kaoru finally got to see her father's face for the first time since before he left for Mexico, which is reportedly 'very handsome.

Kaoru's mother. She is a very good cook and is exceptionally gentle in contrast to her husband and kids. She also likes to smile a lot.

Dai Matsubara

Kaoru's older brother.

Shou Matsubara

Kaoru's younger brother.

Leading Girls of the Great Edo

A long time ago in Edo, when Him was terrorizing its citizens, a man named Kennai Hiraga, who is modeled after Hiraga Gennai, created the special substance "Chemical X". Hiraga poured it on three girls: Momo, Omiya, and Okou. The substance changes their appearance, giving them new hairstyles, now similar to their present day counterparts, and kimono which the bottom portion is shorter than normal, resembling mini skirts, the colors match the Powerpuff Girls Z, and their sashes are black with the symbols of the Powerpuff Girls Z, as well as their own powers and weapons. The three faced and successfully defeated Him, whose weakness to the cold became his undoing. Together with Hiraga, they were able to drain Him's powers and seal his body in a coffin. The Great Edo ChakiChaki Girls can be seen as the heroines who preceded the present day Powerpuff Girls Z and may in fact be their ancestors. Because of his defeat, Him has a deep hatred towards the Great Edo ChakiChaki Girls and directs that hatred towards the Powerpuff Girls Z for their resemblance to them. Similarly to the Steamypuff Girls from the original Powerpuff Girls cartoon, they both stopped a great villain from a previous era.

Natsuki Urawa

A character who appears exclusively in the manga version. A popular kid in school who Momoko has a heavy crush on, though he finds her constantly annoying, despite being admiring her alter ego, Blossom.

Powerpuff Girls 2016-exclusive characters

Blisstina "Bliss"

Blisstina "Bliss" (voiced by Olivia Olson, Toya Delazy, Wengie and Alesha Dixon) is the original Powerpuff Girl in the 2016 series, and is referred to as the fourth one because she is the fourth Powerpuff Girl to be shown in the reboot. She first appears in the five-part special, "The Power of Four". Her hair color is electric blue, and she often wears a pastel blue hairband with a pink heart adorned upon it. In two flashbacks depicting events that occur ten years prior to the main events of the series, Professor Utonium attempts to create the perfect little girl in response to his rival Newtronium creating the perfect little boy; Utonium uses sugar, spice, and everything nice. However, he accidentally adds Chemical W to the concoction, thus creating Bliss. Mojo Jojo also considered himself Bliss' childhood friend when he was the Professor's lab assistant. Bliss possesses superhuman strength, supersonic flight, superhuman hearing, laser vision, and limited invulnerability. However, unlike Blossom, Bubbles and Buttercup and their original 1998 counterparts, Bliss also possesses psionic abilities, but her powers are uncontrollable due to her emotions. As such, in a flashback scene, Bliss' powers caused the destruction of the Professor's residence after she throws a temper tantrum, and the Professor ends up unconscious. Bliss then flies off to Bird Poop Island to keep everyone safe from her superpowers (Mojo himself was saddened to see Bliss run away) and meets her pet elephant, Mee. After spending several years on Bird Poop Island, Bliss moves back to Townsville; after saving the girls from being beaten by the Gnat, she is considered a hero and gets some training to control her powers. But the Professor dismisses her from ever using her powers again, as he insists that she is not ready yet. However, Mee convinces Bliss to prove him wrong as the girls invite her to defeat Chipmunk Commando. Her anger gets the best of her, as she almost hurts the girls, and Mee reveals that he is in fact Him in disguise. He manipulates her into fusing with him, and causes mayhem in Townsville within Bliss's body. But she then breaks free from Him's body thanks to Mojo Jojo, who tries to get her to notice him but fails. Bliss, Blossom, Bubbles, and Buttercup then combine together by the power of sisterhood to defeat Him.

Because of the planet Saturn being moved closer to Earth, Bliss leaves to bring it back to its rightful place in the Solar System. She also pledges to come back to see Utonium and the Powerpuff Girls again when she is done.

The Derbytantes
The Derbytantes (voiced by Kate Higgins and Jessica DiCicco (Maylyn)) are a group of bad girl roller skaters who Buttercup usually likes hanging around with. Introduced in the 2016 series, they never take their skates off and enjoy playing "Deathball" (a sport resembling a cross between dodgeball and Rollerball). Notable members include: Maylyn (the leader, with pink hair and lightning bolts on her uniform), Jaylyn (blue hearts), Haylyn (yellow hearts) and Bobby Susan Ray-Lyn (who looks more like a grown man).

Donny
Donny (voiced by Josh Fadem) is a young unicorn who is best friends with Bubbles. Introduced in the 2016 series, Donny is originally unaware they are unicorns because of the thick hair on their heads, but still seeks to become one by having Professor Utonium transform them into one.

Packrat
Packrat (voiced by Jason Spisak) is a scheming, oversized rat from the sewers. Introduced in the 2016 series, he loves stealing "shiny things" from stores and the people of Townsville, which he sees as gifts for various dolls he views as girlfriends. He broke Bubbles' arm in "Strong Armed". In "Little Octi Lost", he stole Octi from Buttercup.

Allegro
Allegro (voiced by Eric Bauza) is a happy party-obsessed, panda-like being who is capable of causing people to go into a stupor of pure happiness. Introduced in the 2016 series and based on Panda from We Bare Bears, another Cartoon Network series, his true form is a smaller blue bear. He is actually one half of an entity called the Cosmic Bear.

Manboy
Manboy (voiced by Maurice LaMarche) is a short man with super strength and a magical beard (similar to Sedusa's hair) and has a tall wood figure that he uses in battle. Introduced in the 2016 series, he is an enemy to the Powerpuff Girls, mainly to Buttercup, because he is incredibly sexist and constantly declares men are superior to women. He is eventually revealed to be a child who gained an adult body when he got his powers.

The Fashionistas
Bianca and Barbarus Bikini (voiced by Lily Vonnegut (Bianca) and Natalie Palamides (Barbarus' vocal effects)) are a stylish pair respectively consisting of a human and gorilla. Bianca was initially chosen to be the new assistant of the Mayor, before being found out. They have an offshore hideout. Bianca replaces Sedusa as the main villainess in the reboot.

Jemmica/Jemoir
Jemmica (voiced by Anais Fairweather) is a thief who presents herself as a treasure-hunting adventurer but had actually stolen artifacts from archeological digs. It is revealed in "Total Eclipse of the Kart" that she is actually ancient evil Jemoire, Queen of the Storms and she was ultimately stopped when she was frozen by a freeze ray.

Silico
The mysterious villain Silico (voiced by Jason Spisak) first appears in the episode "Viral Spiral", where he offers the Amoeba Boys a way to destroy the internet and finally become big-name villains. In "Halt and Catch Silico", he uses a social media news website Muck Bucket to post false news stories about the Powerpuff Girls. The Powerpuff Girls confront him in his lair and he reveals that he was originally a lonely kid who built toy robot friends to keep him company, however, they were accidentally destroyed when a monster the Powerpuff Girls defeated fell on his house, causing him to swear revenge against the Powerpuff Girls, whom he held responsible due to their carelessness. The Powerpuff Girls manage to defeat him when he unwisely calls Blossom "unorganized", but it turns out to be a hologram he created. In "Take Your Kids to Dooms Day", he steals a power suit to fight the Powerpuff Girls before being defeated by the Professor. In "The Trouble with Bubbles", he hacks a robotic clone of Bubbles to destroy the Powerpuff Girls, but Robo-Bubbles sacrifices herself to defeat him before she explodes. He survives an explosion and disguises himself as the Professor to replace him. In the Episode "Lights Out!", he disguises as Bliss and gave everyone in Townsville, the Butley. He shuts down the power, and mind-controlled everyone in Townsville to antagonize and destroy the Powerpuff Girls, even Bliss too. But was stopped by Bubbles by giving him a modified Butley, he appears to drop a bomb on the girls and leaves the library to explode. Later, he was escorted to jail for his crimes.

Notes
a. According to Cartoon Network's Powerpuff Girls characters page, the name of this group of villains is the "Ganggreen Gang"; however, the official Powerpuff Girls magazine refers to them as "the Gangreen Gang", as well as the series episodes.

References

Lists of characters in American television animation

characters
Hanna-Barbera characters
1990s television-related lists
2000s television-related lists
2010s television-related lists
2020s television-related lists

Lists of anime and manga characters